KSRN (107.7 FM) is a radio station licensed to Kings Beach, California, United States. The station serves the Reno area. The station is currently owned by Lazer Licenses, LLC. KSRN airs a regional Mexican music format branded as "Radio Lazer".

References

External links
 Radio Lazer 107.7 & 105.3 Facebook
 

SRN
Regional Mexican radio stations in the United States